Malaxidinae is an subtribe of orchids in the tribe Malaxideae of the subfamily Epidendroideae.

Genera
Included genera:
 Alatiliparis
 Crepidium
 Crossoglossa
 Crossoliparis
 Dienia
 Hammarbya
 Hippeophyllum
 Liparis
 Malaxis
 Oberonia
 Oberonioides
 Orestias
 Stichorkis
 Tamayorkis

Risleya was previously included, but is now placed in the tribe Collabieae.

References

 
Orchid subtribes